A list of Hong Kong films released in 2017:

See also
 2017 in Hong Kong

References

External links
 IMDB list of Hong Kong films  
 Hong Kong films of 2017 at HKcinemamagic.com

2017
Films
Hong Kong